Myriam de Urquijo (Buenos Aires, April 10, 1918 - May 24, 2011) born Pilar Palacios de Urquijo was an Argentine  film, stage and television actress.

She first appeared on radio in 1942, with her first major film role La Vida de una mujer (1951). She died at age 93 on May 24, 2011.

Filmography
La vida de una mujer  (1951)
Dishonor  (1952) 
Para vestir santos  (1955) 
Angustia de un secreto  (1959) 
Culpable  (1960) 
La Cigarra no es un bicho (1963)Mujeres perdidas  (1964) El reñidero  (1965) Deliciously Amoral (1969) Las procesadas (1975) Crazy Women  (1977) Los drogadictos (1979)

TelevisionLigeia (1959 )Ciclo Myriam de Urquijo (1969 )

References
Blanco Pazos, Roberto (2008). Diccionario de Actrices del Cine Argentino (1933-1997)'' Second edition. Argentina: Corregidor. pp. 82.

External links
de Urquijo at the Internet Movie Database

1918 births
2011 deaths
Actresses from Buenos Aires